Egesina digitata is a species of beetle in the family Cerambycidae. It was described by Pesarini and Sabbadini in 1999.

References

Egesina
Beetles described in 1999